Pol is a municipality in the province of Lugo, Galicia, Spain. Its capital is Mosteiro. It has been historically linked to the arrival in Galicia of Briton immigrants in the Dark Ages period (see Bishop Maeloc and Britonia).

References

Municipalities in the Province of Lugo